Haji Muhammad Mohsin ( – 29 November 1812) was a prominent Bengali Muslim philanthropist. His most notable contribution was to establish the Hooghly Mohsin College and the Hooghly Imambara. He also played a significant role during the Great Bengal famine of 1770 by helping thousands of the victims.

Early life
He was home-schooled and gained knowledge in the study of the Quran, Hadith and the Fiqh. Later, he went on a voyage to other countries of Asia, including the regions in current-day Iran, Iraq, Turkey and the Arab peninsula. He also made the pilgrimage to Mecca, and visited Medina, Kufa, Karbala and other holy places. After performing the Hajj, he was given the title Haji.

Philanthropy 

Following his return, Mohsin took over the management of the estate of his half-sister, Munnujan. She was the widow of Mirza Salahuddin, the Naib-faujdar or deputy military governor of Hooghly working for the Nawab of Bengal. She inherited a fortune from her mother Zainab, whose first husband Aga Motahar had much land and properties in Hooghly, Jessore, Murshidabad and Nadia.

After Munnujan's death in 1803, Mohsin inherited all of her fortune. He bequeathed this fortune for charity and created a Waqf or trust in 1806, with his entire wealth of 156,000 taka. One-third of his fortune was to be donated for education and religious programmes, four-ninths for pensions to the elderly and disabled, and the remaining two-ninths for the expenses of the two trustees.

Death and legacy 
Mohsin died on 29 November 1812.

Due to his contributions in the field of education, Mohsin is the namesake of many educational institutions in India and Bangladesh. The New Hooghly College in Chinsurah, West Bengal, which now bears his name as the Hooghly Mohsin College was established by him. He is the namesake of Government Hazi Mohammad Mohshin College, Chittagong, Bangladesh.Mohsinia Madrasa, Dhaka (Kabi Nazrul Government College) and the Haji Muhammad Mohsin Hall, University of Dhaka.

Mohsin is also the namesake of a Bangladesh Navy base BNS Haji Mohsin located in Dhaka. Commendably, Mohipur Hazi Mohsin Government College is located at Panchbibi, Joypurhat as founded by Maulana Abdul Hamid Khan Bhasani.

Footnotes

References
 Dey, S.C., "Hooghly Past and Present", The Calcutta Review,  Vol.96, No.191, (January 1893), pp.22-42; No.192, (April 1893), 276-288; Vol.97, No.193, (July 1893), pp.71-81; No.194, (October 1893), 340-366;Vol.98, No.195, (January 1894), pp.152-170; Vol.99, No.197, (July 1894), pp.153-164; Vol.104, No.208, (April 1897), pp.355-373.

External links

 

1732 births
1812 deaths
Indian philanthropists
People from Hooghly district
18th-century Bengalis
Bengali Muslims
Bengali educators
18th-century Indian educators
18th-century Indian scholars
Indian social reformers
Indian social workers
Social workers from West Bengal

Founders of Indian schools and colleges